Xu Shiying (September 10, 1873 – October 13, 1964, also romanized as Hsu Shih-ing) was a Chinese Kuomintang politician who served as Premier of the Republic of China from December 26, 1925, to March 4, 1926. He is known as a staunch believer in the rule of law and Western-style legal tenets. Xu contributed to the modernization of the judicial system in China and for initiating prison reform during the presidency of Yuan Shikai.

Biography
Xu was born on September 10, 1873, in Guichi (Kweichih), Anhwei province. He began his career at the Law Compilation Bureau, in the Board of Justice in 1897. After a year, he was appointed to the Board of Punishments. By the age of 25, he was made a Senior Licentiate of the Qing dynasty.

Xu followed his mentor, Shen Jiaben to Taiwan during the Qing government in exile. In 1900, they went back to China where Xu was tasked to head an Outer Beijing city police supervision of infrastructure projects.

In 1908, he was promoted as the associate chief of the high court of justice in the province of Fengtian. Two years later, he was part of the delegation sent to inspect the judicial systems in Europe. He also led the first formal Qing delegation that attended the Eighth International Prison Congress in Washington, D.C. As part of the government's drive to build a modern judicial system, he was appointed Minister of Justice in 1912.

Among Xu's career highlights include his appointment as minister of the interior in 1916; and his appointment, in 1924, to chief secretary of Marshal Duan Qirui, who was head of the Provisional Government of China. Xu was later the Chinese ambassador to Japan, and the chairman of a Chinese delegation for peace negotiations with KMT China.

Xu died in Taipei, Taiwan.

References

External links

 Hsu Shih-ying (Xu Shiying) 許世英 from Biographies of Prominent Chinese c.1925.

1873 births
1964 deaths
Politicians from Chizhou
Republic of China politicians from Anhui
Qing dynasty politicians from Anhui
Ambassadors of China to Japan
Chinese police officers
Justice Ministers of the Republic of China
Senior Advisors to President Chiang Kai-shek
Premiers of the Republic of China
Political office-holders in Shanxi
Political office-holders in Liaoning
Political office-holders in Fujian
Taiwanese people from Anhui
Empire of China (1915–1916)